Tabix is a bioinformatics software utility for indexing large genomic data files. Tabix is free software under the MIT license.

References

External links 
 File format specification
 Command-line utility manual page

Free bioinformatics software